Annamalai 3 is an Indian Tamil-language soap opera that aired Monday through Thursday on MediaCorp Vasantham from 28 December 2015 to 31 March 2016 at 10:30PM SST for 52 episodes.

The show starred Sri Venkatarageaven, Karthik Samasundram, James Kumar, Gayathri Segaran, Indra Chandran and Balakumaran among others. It was director by A. Mohamed Ali, I. Sunder and S.S. Vikneshwaran.

Plot
The story begins somewhere in southern India, with Annamalai leading a normal life. He is now married to Manikkam Chettiar's daughter Natchiammai. He recollects memories of how Simon Ross, the British lawyer, requested for him to care for the small boy and how they left for England.

Cast

 Sri Venkatarageaven as Annamalai
 Karthik Samasundram as Sinnayah
 James Kumar as Rajan Nambi
 Gayathri Segaran as Lalitha
 Indra Chandran as Kanchana
 Balakumaran as Balaji Rao
 Vaish as Gajalakshmi
 Vishnu as Gophi
 Clarence as Bosco
 Lingam as Govindasamy
 Sashirekha as Sampoornam
 Panneeirchelvam as Maasilamani
 Shahul Hameed as Investigation Officer
 Narain as Vishwa Rao
 Ravee Vellu as Masanam
 Varman Ohnadra Mohan as krishnan
 Bharathi Rani as Saniya
 Kokilatha as Theivanai
 Shabnam as Nacchammai
 Nachiyappan as Nachi Chettiyar
 R. Krishnavani as Annamalai Mother
 Thiyaga Rajan as Siva
 Jaanani Netra as Janani
 Usha Rani as Usha
 Noorul as Raaji
 Shreedhee Sajeev as Madhbala
 Debra as Ruth

Original soundtrack

Soundtrack

Seasons overview

Season 1

The first season was aired 22 December 2014 to 31 March 2015 every Monday to Thursday at 10:30PM SST for 48 episodes. The show starred James Kumar, Karthik Samasundram, Bharathi, Varman, Sri and Jemes Dorairaj among others. It was director by I. Sunder, S.s. Vikneshwaran, A. Mohamed Ali and Nagaraj Veerappan.

Season 2
The second season, titled Annamalai Day of Reckoning was aired 29 June 2015 to 1 October 2015 every Monday to Thursday at 10:30PM SST for 52 episodes.

Airing history 
The show started airing on MediaCorp Vasantham on 29 June 2015 and It aired on Monday through Thursday 10:00PM SST. Later its timing changed Starting from Monday 20 Juli 2015, the show was shifted to 10:30PM IST time Slot. A show named Vetri (season 2) replaced this show at 10:00PM SST.

References

External links 
 Vasantham Official Website

2015 Tamil-language television seasons
2016 Tamil-language television seasons